Ariel Motor Company Ltd is a British, low-volume performance motor vehicle manufacturing company in Crewkerne, in Somerset, England.

History
Founded by Simon Saunders in 1991 as Solocrest Ltd., the name was changed in 1999 to Ariel Motor Company Ltd. The original Ariel Motors remains as the trading company of the Ariel Owners Motorcycle Club (AOMCC) Ariel Motorcycles firm. Ariel Motor Company is one of the UK's smallest automotive companies, with just 30 employees, producing up to 100 cars per year.

Products

Atom 

The company manufactures the Ariel Atom, an extremely light, high performance car, powered by a Honda Civic Type-R engine and gearbox.

In July 2018, at the Goodwood Festival of Speed Ariel announced and started taking reservations for their new Ariel Atom 4. The new car is completely revised from the previous Ariel Atom, with all but a few parts having been changed. The new car is powered again by the engine used in the Honda Civic Type R, but is now turbo charged as standard in the Atom 4. The new car also features a thicker frame, separate seats and a revised intake. The new car has been reviewed by Autocar and deliveries started at the start of June  2019.

Ace 

In June 2014, the company announced the new Ariel Ace motorcycle. Powered by a Honda 1237cc V4 engine and gearbox, the bike will be produced from 2015 in similar volume levels to the existing car-based products.

Nomad 

In January 2015, Ariel introduced the Nomad, a road-legal buggy designed along the same principles as the Atom, at the Autosport International Show. The Nomad utilises a 2.4 litre Honda engine producing 235bhp.

HIPERCAR 
In August 2017, Ariel announced the HIPERCAR (High Performance Carbon Reduction), an electric sports car. The HIPERCAR uses Equipmake APM200 electric motors, supplied by a Norfolk-based electric bus manufacturing start-up.

See also
 List of car manufacturers of the United Kingdom

References

External links

 

Vehicle manufacturing companies established in 1991
Car brands
Crewkerne
Car manufacturers of the United Kingdom
Companies based in Somerset
Sports car manufacturers